Green Ice is the soundtrack to the 1981 United Kingdom adventure film Green Ice starring Ryan O'Neal. The soundtrack was recorded by Bill Wyman and contains 18 original songs.

Track listing

Personnel
Bill Wyman – bass, guitars, harmonica, synthesizers, percussion
Terry Taylor – acoustic, electric and Spanish guitars, kyoto, synthesizers, percussion 
Dave Mattacks – drums, percussion
Ray Cooper – Latin percussion
Doreen Chanter, Maria Muldaur, Stuart Epps – background vocals
Dave Richmond – bass on "Floating (Cloudhopper Theme)" and "Tenderness"
Tristan Fry – marimba on "Noche de Amore" 
Kenny Baker – trumpet on "Colombia (Green Ice Opening Title)" and "Sol y Sombra" 
Dave Lawson – vocoder, synthesizer on "Floating (Cloudhopper Theme)" and "Emerald Vault"
Ken Thorne – orchestral conductor and arranger

References

External links
 Green Ice at Discogs

Adventure film soundtracks
1981 soundtrack albums
Polydor Records soundtracks
Bill Wyman albums